Khyber Shah (born 1 April 1965) is a Pakistani boxer. He competed in the men's welterweight event at the 1992 Summer Olympics.

References

External links
 

1965 births
Living people
Pakistani male boxers
Olympic boxers of Pakistan
Boxers at the 1992 Summer Olympics
Place of birth missing (living people)
Welterweight boxers